Landtag elections in the Free State of Anhalt (Freistaat Anhalt) during the Weimar Republic were held at irregular intervals between 1918 and 1932. Results with regard to the total vote, the percentage of the vote won and the number of seats allocated to each party are presented in the tables below. On 31 March 1933, the sitting Landtag was dissolved by the Nazi-controlled central government and reconstituted to reflect the distribution of seats in the national Reichstag. The Landtag subsequently was formally abolished as a result of the "Law on the Reconstruction of the Reich" of 30 January 1934 which replaced the German federal system with a unitary state.

1918
The 1918 Anhalt state election was held on 15 December 1918 to elect the 36 members of the Constituent National Assembly.

1920
The 1920 Anhalt state election was held on 6 June 1920 to elect the 36 members of the Landtag.

1924
The first 1924 Anhalt state election was held on 22 June 1924 to elect the 36 members of the Landtag.

The second 1924 Anhalt state election was held on 9 November 1924 to elect the 36 members of the Landtag.

1928
The 1928 Anhalt state election was held on 20 May 1928 to elect the 36 members of the Landtag.

1932
The 1932 Anhalt state election was held on 24 April 1932 to elect the 36 members of the Landtag.

References

Elections in the Weimar Republic
Anhalt
Anhalt
Anhalt
Anhalt
Anhalt